The following is a list of teams and cyclists who took part in the 2022 Vuelta a España.

Teams 
Sources:

UCI WorldTeams

 
 
 
 
 
 
 
 
 
 
 
 
 
 
 
 
 
 

UCI ProTeams

Cyclists

By starting number

By team

By nationality

References

External links 
 

2022 Vuelta a España
2022